Stony Lake may refer to:

Lakes 
 Stony Lake (Ontario), Canada
 Stony Lake (Manitoba), Canada
 Stony Lake (Hubbard County, Minnesota)
 Stony Lake (New York), in Lewis County
 Rollway Lake, also known as Stony Lake, in Newaygo County, Michigan, USA
 Stony Lake in Granite County, Montana

Communities 
 Stony Lake, Michigan, unincorporated community in Oceana County, Michigan, USA

See also 
 Stone Lake (disambiguation)